Girl from the Mountain Village (Swedish: Flickan från fjällbyn) is a 1948 Swedish drama film directed by Anders Henrikson and starring Bengt Blomgren,  Eva Dahlbeck and Carl Deurell. It was shot at the Sundbyberg Studios of Europa Film in Stockholm and on location in Härjedalen and Northern Norway.

Synopsis
At the beginning of the twentieth century the inhabitants of a Norrland village are compelled by crop failures to emigrate, and become part of the large Swedish movement to the United States.

Cast
 Bengt Blomgren as 	Erik
 Eva Dahlbeck as 	Isa
 Einar Hylander as 	Manuel
 Carl Deurell as 	Gammel-Jerk
 Kaj Nohrborg as 	Gustav
 Sif Ruud as 	Erika
 Else-Marie Brandt as 	Ellen

References

Bibliography 
 Wallengren, Ann-Kristin.  Welcome Home Mr Swanson: Swedish Emigrants and Swedishness on Film. Nordic Academic Press, 2014.

External links 
 

1948 films
1948 drama films
1940s Swedish-language films
Films directed by Anders Henrikson
Films set in the 1900s
Swedish historical drama films
1940s historical drama films
Films set in Sweden
1940s Swedish films